North Carolina's 120th House district is one of 120 districts in the North Carolina House of Representatives. It has been represented by Republican Karl Gillespie since 2021.

Geography
Since 2013, the district has included all of Graham, Cherokee, Clay, and Macon counties. The district overlaps with the 50th Senate district.

District officeholders since 2003

Election results

2022

2020

2018

2016

2014

2012

2010

2008

2006

2004

2002

References

North Carolina House districts
Graham County, North Carolina
Cherokee County, North Carolina
Clay County, North Carolina
Macon County, North Carolina